This is a list of personal standards of the Kings of Portugal.

See also 
Flag of Portugal
Portuguese vexillology

Portugal
Personal standards
Portugal